John Bryce Ramsay (1 September 1896 – 28 April 1917) was a Scottish professional footballer who played in the Scottish League for Falkirk as an inside right.

Personal life
Ramsay worked as a boat builder. On 25 May 1915, nine months after the outbreak of the First World War, he enlisted in the 63rd (Royal Naval) Division. Rising to the rank of able seaman, he saw action at Gallipoli and on the Western Front. Ramsay was killed near Arras, France on 29 April 1917 and is commemorated on the Arras Memorial. His younger brother Alexander was killed in November 1916.

Honours 
Falkirk

 Falkirk Infirmary Shield: 1914–15

References

Scottish footballers
1917 deaths
British military personnel killed in World War I
1896 births
Scottish Football League players
Falkirk F.C. players
People from Grangemouth
Royal Naval Volunteer Reserve personnel of World War I
63rd (Royal Naval) Division soldiers
Association football inside forwards
Footballers from Falkirk (council area)
Scottish military personnel
Scottish Protestants